The following are the Pulitzer Prizes for 1987.

Journalism
Public service: Pittsburgh Press
"For reporting by Andrew Schneider and Matthew Brelis which revealed the inadequacy of the FAA's medical screening of airline pilots and led to significant reforms."
General news reporting: Staff of the Akron Beacon Journal
"For its coverage, under deadline pressure, of the attempted takeover of Goodyear Tire and Rubber Co. by a European financier."
Investigative reporting: John Woestendiek of The Philadelphia Inquirer
"For outstanding prison beat reporting, which included proving the innocence of a man convicted of murder."
Investigative reporting: Daniel R. Biddle, H. G. Bissinger and Fredric N. Tulsky of The Philadelphia Inquirer
For their series "Disorder in the Court," which revealed transgressions of justice in the Philadelphia court system and led to federal and state investigations."
Explanatory reporting: Jeff Lyon and Peter Gorner of the Chicago Tribune
"For their series on the promises of gene therapy, which examined the implications of this revolutionary medical treatment."
Specialized Reporting: Alex S. Jones of The New York Times
"For "The Fall of the House of Bingham," a skillful and sensitive report of a powerful newspaper family's bickering and how it led to the sale of a famed media empire."
National Reporting: Staff of The Miami Herald
"For its exclusive reporting and persistent coverage of the U.S.-Iran-Contra connection."
National Reporting: Staff of The New York Times
"For coverage of the aftermath of the Challenger explosion, which included stories that identified serious flaws in the shuttle's design and in the administration of America's space program."
International reporting: Michael Parks of the Los Angeles Times
"For his balanced and comprehensive coverage of South Africa."
Feature writing: Steve Twomey of The Philadelphia Inquirer
"For his illuminating profile of life aboard an aircraft carrier."
Commentary: Charles Krauthammer of The Washington Post Writers Group
"For his witty and insightful columns on national issues."
Criticism: Richard Eder of the Los Angeles Times
"For his book reviews."
Editorial writing: Jonathan Freedman of The San Diego Union-Tribune
"For his editorials urging passage of the first major immigration reform act in 34 years."
Editorial cartooning: Berkeley Breathed of The Washington Post Writers Group
Spot news photography: Kim Komenich of the San Francisco Examiner
"For his photographic coverage of the fall of Ferdinand Marcos."
Feature photography: David Peterson of Des Moines Register
"For his photographs depicting the shattered dreams of American farmers."

Letters and Drama
 Fiction: A Summons to Memphis by Peter Taylor (Alfred A. Knopf)
 Drama:  Fences by August Wilson (Plume)
 History: Voyagers to the West: A Passage in the Peopling of America on the Eve of the Revolution by Bernard Bailyn (Alfred A. Knopf)
 Biography or Autobiography: Bearing the Cross: Martin Luther King Jr. and the Southern Christian Leadership Conference by David J. Garrow (William Morrow)
 Poetry: Thomas and Beulah by Rita Dove (Carnegie-Mellon University Press)
 General non-fiction: Arab and Jew: Wounded Spirits in a Promised Land by David K. Shipler (Times Books)
 Music: The Flight Into Egypt by John Harbison (Associated Music Publishers)Premiered November 21, 1987, by Cantata Singers and Ensemble.

Special Citations and Awards

 Special Awards and Citations - Journalism: Joseph Pulitzer Jr.
"For his extraordinary services to American journalism and letters during his 31 years as chairman of the Pulitzer Prize Board and for his accomplishments as an editor and publisher."

References

External links
 

Pulitzer Prizes by year
Pulitzer Prize
Pulitzer Prize